The 2014–15 Primera División Femenina de Fútbol was the 27th edition of Spain's highest women's football league.

Barcelona defended the title for the third straight season. The competition, running from 7 September 2014 to 3 May 2015, and was contested by sixteen teams, with Fundación Albacete and Santa Teresa CD making their debut.

For the first time two teams qualified to the UEFA Women's Champions League, as Spain has climbed into the top eight nations by UEFA coefficient.

Stadia and locations

League table

Results

Season statistics

Top scorers

Best goalkeepers

Hat-tricks

4 Player scored 4 goals

Signings

References

See also
Royal Spanish Football Federation

External links
 Superliga Official Website

2014-15
Spa
1
women's